NH 118 may refer to:

 National Highway 118 (India)
 New Hampshire Route 118, United States